Planes, Trains and Automobiles is a 1987 American comedy film written, produced and directed by John Hughes and starring Steve Martin and John Candy with supporting roles by Laila Robins and Michael McKean. It tells the story of a high-strung marketing executive and a goodhearted but annoying shower curtain ring salesman who become travel companions when their flight is diverted and share a three-day odyssey of misadventures trying to get to Chicago in time for the executive's Thanksgiving Day dinner with his family.

The film received critical acclaim, with many praising it for Hughes branching out from teen comedies, and for Candy's and Martin's performances. It has become a Thanksgiving Day tradition for many.

Plot

Neal Page is an advertising executive on a business trip in New York City eager to return to his family in Chicago two days before Thanksgiving. After a late-running business meeting with an indecisive client named Mr. Bryant, Neal struggles to hail a cab during rush hour. As he bribes a man to let him have a cab he has hailed, someone else takes it.

Neal arrives at LaGuardia Airport just as his flight is delayed. While waiting, he meets the person who unwittingly stole his cab, Del Griffith, a loquacious man who sells shower curtain rings. To his chagrin, Neal is assigned a seat next to Del on the crowded flight to O'Hare.

Due to a blizzard in Chicago, the plane is diverted to Wichita, where Neal and Del must stay overnight as Neal tells his wife, Susan, what happened. Neal is unable to book a room, but Del has reserved one. Neal reluctantly accepts Del's promise of a room if Neal pays for their cab ride to the motel. During check-in, Del mistakenly takes Neal's credit card. Forced to share the last available room, Neal loses his temper over Del's irritating behavior. Del is hurt, but they calm down and awkwardly share the only bed. While they sleep, a burglar steals their cash.

The next day, with air travel still prohibitively delayed, Neal buys them both train tickets to Chicago, but with seats in separate cars. The locomotive breaks down near Jefferson City, stranding its passengers in a field. Neal takes pity on Del struggling with his trunk, and they reunite. They travel on a crowded bus to St. Louis, where Del raises cash by selling curtain ring samples to passersby as earrings. Neal offends Del over lunch and the two part ways again.

At the St. Louis Airport, Neal attempts to rent a car, but it is missing when he gets to the lot. After a long and perilous walk back to the terminal, he vents his anger in a profane tirade at the rental agent to no avail. He attempts to book a taxi to Chicago, but impatiently insults the dispatcher who then punches him. By chance, Del arrives at the scene in his own rental car, and takes the dazed Neal with him. As they drive, they argue again.

After nightfall, Del nearly gets them killed by driving in the wrong direction on a freeway. As they compose themselves by the side of the road, Del's carelessly discarded cigarette sets fire to the car. Neal initially gloats, thinking that Del is liable for the damage, until Del reveals he had found Neal's credit card in his wallet and used it to rent the car.

With his credit cards destroyed in the fire, Neal barters his expensive watch for a motel room. Del has nothing of value, so he attempts to sleep in the charred, roofless car. Seeing this, Neal pities Del and invites him inside. They share Del's collection of miniature liquors and laugh about the events of the past two days.

The pair resume driving to Chicago the next morning, but their car is impounded by the Illinois State Patrol as unroadworthy. Del persuades a trucker to take them into Chicago and they ride in the semi's refrigerated trailer.

At a Chicago "L" station, Neal sincerely thanks Del for getting him home, and they part ways with affection. As Neal rides a commuter train to his neighborhood, he thinks about the trip, recalling some of Del's odd comments and silences during the journey. It occurs to him that Del has not actually been trying to get home himself. Neal returns to the station, where he finds Del still sitting. Del explains that he does not have a home and that his wife died eight years earlier. Neal brings Del home with him for Thanksgiving dinner and introduces his family to his new friend.

In a post-credit scene, Mr. Bryant is still in the office alongside a half-eaten Thanksgiving dinner trying to decide on a poster.

Cast

Production

Filming
Planes, Trains and Automobiles began filming in February 1987 and lasted 85 days, mostly in Batavia, New York, and South Dayton, New York. A scene that takes place in St. Louis was filmed at St. Louis Lambert International Airport. There was also a scene in Braidwood, Illinois, at the Sun Motel. Rewrites Hughes did during filming made the amount of footage he shot much larger than the original screenplay needed, and the film's first cut was three hours and 45 minutes long. A subplot about Neal's wife not believing him and suspecting that he is with other women was cut.

Soundtrack
The soundtrack to Planes, Trains & Automobiles features a mix of rock and roll, country and pop. The frenetic musical score by Ira Newborn makes extensive use of the folk song "Red River Valley," including a cover of Johnny and the Hurricanes' rock and roll version, "Red River Rock", performed by the British group Silicon Teens. Among other tracks is a cover version of "Back in Baby's Arms". The song, popularized by Patsy Cline, is performed by Emmylou Harris. Another popular song used in the movie is "Mess Around" written by Ahmet Ertegun and performed by Ray Charles. 

A cover version of Six Days on the Road was used in the film, performed by Steve Earle & The Dukes. The film also featured the contemporary pop song "Modigliani (Lost in Your Eyes)" by Book of Love, using both the original single and the Requiem Mass Remix. A special instrumental version of "Power to Believe" by The Dream Academy, which the band recorded at Hughes's request, is extensively used in the film as Del's unofficial theme. 

A cover of "Everytime You Go Away" performed by Blue Room is played over the final scene and the credits; Hughes planned to use Paul Young's well-known hit version but was denied the rights by the record company even though Young approved of Hughes's planned use of the song and wanted to see it included. The soundtrack album was released in 1987 as a physical vinyl and compact disc, but has since gone out of print. It is available for download on iTunes. "Everytime You Go Away" and "Power to Believe" were not included on the album (the soundtrack instead featured the original version of "Power to Believe" with lyrics). The instrumental version of "Power to Believe" was not released until 2014, when The Dream Academy included it on its compilation album The Morning Lasted All Day: A Retrospective.

Release

Box office
The movie opened in American theaters on November 25, 1987 (the Wednesday before Thanksgiving), and finished third for the weekend, grossing $7,009,482. After its first five days, the film grossed $10,131,242 and stayed in the top ten for seven weeks. The movie finished its 12-week American run on January 22, 1988, with $49,530,280. The production budget was $15 million. The film was released in the United Kingdom on February 12, 1988, and topped the country's box office that weekend.

Reception
The film marked a widely noticed change in the repertoire of John Hughes, generally considered a teen angst filmmaker at the time. It was greeted with critical acclaim upon release, in particular receiving two thumbs up from Siskel & Ebert, with Gene Siskel declaring it Candy's best role to date. The film was featured in Roger Ebert's "Great Movies" collection, Ebert writing that it "is perfectly cast and soundly constructed, and all else flows naturally. Steve Martin and John Candy don't play characters; they embody themselves. That's why the comedy, which begins securely planted in the twin genres of the road movie and the buddy picture, is able to reveal so much heart and truth." Leonard Maltin called the movie a "bittersweet farce", arguing that while the film was "hurt by an awful music score", Hughes "refuses to make either one (Martin or Candy) a caricature—which keeps this amiable film teetering between slapstick shenanigans and compassionate comedy."

On Rotten Tomatoes, the film holds an approval rating of 92% based on 66 reviews, with an average score of 7.9/10. The site's critics consensus states: "Thanks to the impeccable chemistry between Steve Martin and John Candy, as well as a deft mix of humor and heart, Planes, Trains and Automobiles is a hilarious, heartfelt holiday classic." On Metacritic it has a score of 72 out of 100 based on 22 critics, indicating "generally favorable reviews". Audiences polled by CinemaScore gave the film an average grade "B+" on scale of A+ to F.

Post-release

Themes 
Argun Ulgen categorized Planes, Trains and Automobiles as a lively portrayal of in-person interactions between people of different economic classes: "people curse, make out in public, speak in platitudes, and retell the same jokes; generally, they are coarse and loud, imperfect, but not without love."

Home media 
Planes, Trains and Automobiles had its first DVD release on November 21, 2000, when a 480i widescreen version of the film was issued on DVD in the United States. The DVD featured its original English soundtrack in Dolby Digital 5.1 Surround Sound and English subtitles; but had no foreign language options for subtitles and audio. The same 5.1 English audio track was later included on 576i DVDs issued in European territories the following year. The UK, Danish and Finnish releases include a stereo version of the German dub and Finnish, Swedish, English, German, Arabic, Bulgarian, Czech, Danish, Dutch, Hungarian, Icelandic, Norwegian, Polish, Romanian, and Turkish subtitles. Both the Italy and Spain editions include French, Italian, and Spanish stereo dubs; and have Spanish, Portuguese, English, French, Italian, Croatian, Greek, Hebrew, and Slovenian subtitles. The Swedish DVD, on the other hand, is the most limited in features, only including the English audio and Swedish subtitles. An American "Those Aren't Pillows!" DVD edition of Planes, Trains and Automobiles includes a mono Spanish dub and English, French, and Spanish subtitles. The same day, Wal-mart issued an exclusive version of the edition that included a digital copy of the film.

The film's first United States Blu-ray was released on September 25, 2011, as a Best Buy exclusive. Canada's first Blu-ray of the film, also issued on September 25, was a Future Shop exclusive of the "Those Aren't Pillows!" edition. The Blu-ray was released in the United Kingdom on September 26, 2011, Australia on July 31, 2013, and Germany on February 5, 2015.

On October 18, 2004, the UK DVD was issued as part of a Digipack Paramount Pictures' collection I Love 80s Movies: John Hughes Classic 80s, which also included Pretty in Pink (1986), Ferris Bueller's Day Off (1986), and Some Kind of Wonderful (1987).

In October 2022, Paramount announced a 4K Ultra HD Blu-ray release. The release includes 75 minutes of deleted and extended footage, much of which was thought to be lost but was rediscovered and cleaned up from the John Hughes archive. It was released in the U.S. on November 22, 2022.

Remake
In August 2020, a remake was reported in development, with Will Smith and Kevin Hart as the leads, and later Drew Barrymore and Adam Sandler.

References

External links

 
 
 
 

1987 films
1987 comedy films
1980s buddy comedy films
1980s comedy road movies
American adventure comedy films
American buddy comedy films
American comedy road movies
American screwball comedy films
1980s English-language films
Films directed by John Hughes (filmmaker)
Films produced by John Hughes (filmmaker)
Films scored by Ira Newborn
Films set in airports
Films set in Chicago
Films set in hotels
Films set in Illinois
Films set in Kansas
Films set in Missouri
Films set in New York City
Films shot in Chicago
Films shot in Illinois
Films shot in New York (state)
Films shot in New York City
Films shot in Ohio
Films shot in St. Louis
Films with screenplays by John Hughes (filmmaker)
Paramount Pictures films
Rail transport films
Thanksgiving in films
1980s American films